The Man Who Waited is a 1922 American silent Western film directed by Edward Ludwig and starring Jay Morley, Vonda Phelps and Milla Davenport.

Cast
 Frank Braidwood as Frank Magee
 Inez MacDonald as June Rance
 Jay Morley asJoe Rance
 Jack P. Pierce as Black Pete 
 Vonda Phelps as June, as a baby
 Dan Maines as Sandy
 Joe Bonner as Manuel Sánchez
 Milla Davenport as Madre Sánchez

References

Bibliography
 Connelly, Robert B. The Silents: Silent Feature Films, 1910-36, Volume 40, Issue 2. December Press, 1998.
 Munden, Kenneth White. The American Film Institute Catalog of Motion Pictures Produced in the United States, Part 1. University of California Press, 1997.

External links
 

1922 films
1922 Western (genre) films
1920s English-language films
American silent feature films
Silent American Western (genre) films
Films directed by Edward Ludwig
American black-and-white films
1920s American films